The Players Tour Championship 2010/2011 – Event 3 (also known as Star Xing Pai Players Tour Championship 2010/2011 – Event 3 for sponsorship purposes) was a professional minor-ranking snooker tournament that took place between 6–8 August 2010 at the World Snooker Academy in Sheffield, England. The preliminary rounds took place on 24 July at the same venue.

Barry Hawkins made the 72nd official maximum break during his last 32 match against James McGouran. This was Hawkins' first official 147.

Tom Ford won his first professional title by defeating Jack Lisowski 4–0 in the final.

Prize fund and ranking points
The breakdown of prize money and ranking points of the event is shown below:

1 Only professional players can earn ranking points.

Main draw

Preliminary rounds

Round 1
Best of 7 frames

Round 2
Best of 7 frames

Main rounds

Top half

Section 1

Section 2

Section 3

Section 4

Bottom half

Section 5

Section 6

Section 7

Section 8

Finals

Final

Century breaks

 147, 134, 129, 102  Barry Hawkins
 141, 120, 102  Mark Davis
 141  Ryan Day
 141  Jeff Cundy
 140  Shaun Murphy
 136  Neil Robertson
 133, 118  Robbie Williams
 130  Jamie Cope
 125  Rory McLeod
 123  Ben Harrison
 120  Stuart Bingham

 118  James McBain
 116  Liam Highfield
 113, 101, 100  Stuart Pettman
 110  Andy Hicks
 110  Anthony Hamilton
 107  Stuart Carrington
 106  Dominic Dale
 105  Martin O'Donnell
 104, 101  Mark Selby
 103  Martin Gould

References

3
2010 in English sport

sv:Players Tour Championship 2010/2011#Players Tour Championship 3